The Japan women's national baseball team is part of the Baseball Federation of Japan. It represents the country of Japan in women's international competitions. The team is a member of the Baseball Federation of Asia. They won the 2018 Women's Baseball World Cup, and are currently ranked 1st in the world by the World Baseball Softball Confederation.

Tournament record

Women's Baseball Asian Cup

Women's Baseball World Cup

Roster 
The roster as of 8/8/2014

References

External links
 Website
 Japan women's national baseball team on YouTube
 

 
Women's national baseball teams
Baseball women
Women's baseball in Japan